Edward A. Richardson (July 10, 1924 – December 19, 2019) was a self-taught tree expert who spent years studying the trees of Connecticut. Richardson, a World War II veteran who made his living in Connecticut's insurance industry, volunteered numerous hours of his time to find, measure and catalog large and interesting trees for the Notable Tree Survey of the Connecticut Botanical Society, which resulted in the publication of Glenn Dreyer's book, "Connecticut's Notable Trees," in 1989. Richardson mapped out the trees in Hartford's Bushnell Park, Institute of Living, Elizabeth Park and Cedar Hill Cemetery. Over the years, Richardson also led numerous tree tours throughout the state of Connecticut. 

On November 15, 2018, the Connecticut Forest and Park Association presented Richardson with an Official Statement issued by Governor Dannel Malloy, honoring Richardson's years of service to the trees of Connecticut.

References

External links
Connecticut's Notable Trees
Connecticut Forest & Park Association (CFPA)
Elizabeth Park Conservancy, "Trees of Elizabeth Park Tree Trail" video featuring Ed Richardson
Living on Earth, PRI's Environmental News Magazine; Air Date: September 7, 2012; Segment: Bagging Big Trees (Bobby Bascomb)

American businesspeople in insurance
1924 births
2019 deaths
People from Connecticut
United States Army personnel of World War II
Environmental volunteering
United States Army soldiers